N-word is a euphemism for nigger, an ethnic slur typically directed at black people.

(The) N-word may also refer to:

The N-Word, a 2004 documentary film
The N Word: One Man's Stand, a 2005 autobiography by Stephen Hagan
The N-Word of the Narcissus, a 2009 rework of the 1897 novel The Nigger of the "Narcissus"
 In Danish grammar, a linguistic term meaning "of common grammatical gender"